Out of Body is the fifth studio album by American rock band the Hooters, released in May 1993 by MCA Records.

Background
Out of Body marked a series of firsts for the Hooters.  It was their first album for MCA Records after having released their three previous albums on Columbia Records. It was the first time they had worked with producer Joe Hardy, whose credits included ZZ Top, Steve Earle and Tom Cochrane. Also, the Hooters had become a six-piece band for the first time, after the addition of violinist and singer Mindy Jostyn.

Band members Eric Bazilian and Rob Hyman first met Jostyn backstage after a 1989 Billy Joel concert at the Spectrum in Philadelphia. She was given a copy of their previous album Zig Zag and two years later, in December 1991, they called her in New York and asked to get together with them. Jostyn officially joined the band in January 1992.

The recording process for Out of Body was also significantly different than their previous efforts. Rather than allow the band to work on a song significantly before recording, as they had always done, producer Joe Hardy took tracks directly from the Hooters' demos and made them "commit and move on." The resulting album was recorded in just four weeks, whereas previous albums by the band had taken four to six months to record.

One of the songs on the album, "Private Emotion," would go on to become an international hit single for Ricky Martin in 2000, with both Hyman and Bazilian contributing to the new recording.

Track listing
 "Twenty Five Hours a Day" (Rob Hyman, Eric Bazilian, Jerry Lynn Williams) – 3:50
 "Boys Will Be Boys" (Hyman, Bazilian, Cyndi Lauper) – 4:42
 "Shadow of Jesus" (Bazilian, Glenn Goss) – 5:35
 "Great Big American Car" (Hyman, Bazilian, Wendy Waldman) – 5:16
 "Private Emotion" (Hyman, Bazilian) – 3:58
 "Driftin' Away" (Hyman, Bazilian) – 4:57
 "Dancing on the Edge" (Hyman, Bazilian, John Bettis) – 3:38
 "All Around the Place" (Hyman, Bazilian) – 3:45
 "One Too Many Nights" (Hyman, Bazilian) – 4:25
 "Nobody But You" (Hyman, Bazilian, Williams) – 5:21
Japanese bonus track
 "Strange Strange World" (Hyman, Bazilian, Waldman) – 4:06 (B-side of "Twenty Five Hours a Day")

Personnel
Adapted from the album liner notes.

The Hooters
Rob Hyman – lead vocals, piano, organ, synthesizer, Mellotron, accordion, percussion, melodica
Eric Bazilian – lead vocals, guitars, mandolin, bass, sitar, melodica, saxophone, recorder, synthesizer, percussion
David Uosikkinen – drums, percussion
John Lilley – guitar, vocals
Fran Smith Jr. – bass, vocals, tambourine
Mindy Jostyn – violin, vocals, guitar, harmonica, string arrangements

Additional musicians
Cyndi Lauper – vocals on "Boys Will Be Boys"
The Memphis Horns:  
Andrew Love – tenor saxophone on "All Around the Place" and "Nobody But You"
Wayne Jackson – trumpet, trombone on "All Around the Place" and "Nobody But You"
Linda Minke – cello on "Shadow of Jesus"
Max Huls – violin on "Shadow of Jesus"

Technical
Joe Hardy – producer, engineer (digital), mixing (digital) (at Ardent Studios)
Eric Bazilian – producer, engineer (analog) (at The Ranch)
Rob Hyman – producer, assistant engineer (analog) (at The Ranch)
Erik Flettrich – assistant engineer (digital) (at Ardent Studios)
George Marino – mastering (at Sterling Sound)
Bo Bartlett – art direction, cover art (anolog)
Greg Merkle – design, cover art (digital)
Rob Hyman – cover concept
Eric Bazilian – cover concept
Charles Grumbling – art production guru
Michael Dwornik – photography 
Robin Schoen – typography (heads) 
Norisol Valero – typography (threads)

References

1993 albums
The Hooters albums
Albums produced by Eric Bazilian
MCA Records albums
Albums produced by Rob Hyman